A by-election for the Osaka 12th district in the Japanese House of Representatives was held on 21 April 2019. The by-election was called following the death of the incumbent member Tomokatsu Kitagawa, a member of the Liberal Democratic Party (LDP), from peritonitis on 26 December 2018. Kitagawa had served the district almost continuously since 2005 (except between 2009–12) and defended the seat by a narrow 4.4% margin in the 2017 election, making the seat a potential battleground. The by-election was held on the same day with the second round of the unified local elections and another House by-election for the Okinawa 3rd district.

The by-election was won by Nippon Ishin no Kai's Fumitake Fujita, marking a gain for the party.

Candidates 
Shinji Tarutoko (Independent), former Minister for Internal Affairs and Communications and representative for the district.
Shinpei Kitagawa (LDP), event organiser and nephew of Tomokatsu Kitagawa.
Fumitake Fujita (Ishin), company president.
Takeshi Miyamoto (Independent - JCP), former member of the House of Representatives.

Campaign

Results

Footnotes

References 

Osaka 12th by-election
2019
Osaka by-election
Election and referendum articles with incomplete results

ja:2019年日本の補欠選挙#補欠選挙実施選挙区と実施事由